—

Special Shabbatot are Jewish Shabbat (Hebrew, שבת shabbath) days on which special events are commemorated. Variations in the liturgy and special customs differentiate them from the other Shabbats (Hebrew, סבתות Shabbatot) and each one is referred to by a special name. Many communities also add piyyutim on many of these special Shabbatot. Two such Shabbats, Shabbat Mevarchim—the Shabbat preceding a new Hebrew month—and Shabbat Rosh Chodesh (which coincides with the new month/moon) can occur on several occasions throughout the year. The other special Shabbats occur on specific sabbaths before or coinciding with certain Jewish holidays during the year according to a fixed pattern.

Shabbat Shuvah – Return

Shabbat Shuvah or Shabbat T'shuvah ("Sabbath [of] Return" שבת שובה or "Sabbath [of] Repentance" שבת תשובה) refers to the Shabbat that occurs during the Ten Days of Repentance, but is between (i.e. not including) the two consecutive Days of Rosh Hashanah, and the Day of Yom Kippur. It is alternately known as Shabbat T'shuvah owing to its being one of the Aseret Y'may T'shuvah (Ten Days of Repentance).

Shabbat Shirah – Song

Shabbat Shirah ("Sabbath [of] song" שבת שירה) is the name given to the Shabbat that includes Parsha Beshalach.  The Torah reading of the week contains the Song of the sea (Exodus 15:1–18).  This was the song by the Children of Israel after the Passage of the Red Sea. There is no special Torah reading.  The haftarah includes the Song of Deborah. There is an Ashkenazi custom to feed wild birds on this Shabbat, in recognition of their help to Moses in the Desert.

The Four Parshiyot

These are four special Sabbaths, each of which derives its name from the additional Torah portion that is read that day. Two of the Sabbaths occur in the weeks leading up to Purim and two in the weeks then leading up to Passover.

Shabbat Shekalim – of Shekels

Shabbat Shekalim ("Sabbath [of] shekels" שבת שקלים) requests each adult male Jew contribute half of a Biblical shekel for the upkeep of the Tabernacle, or mishkan (משכן). The Torah portion Exodus 30:11-16 (the beginning of Parashah Ki Tisa) is read.  This Shabbat takes place on the Shabbat before or on 1 Adar.  In leap years of the Hebrew calendar, when there are two months of Adar, Shabbat Shekalim is on the Shabbat before or on 1 Adar II.

Shabbat Zachor – of Remembrance

Shabbat Zachor ("Sabbath [of] remembrance שבת זכור) is the Shabbat immediately preceding Purim. Deuteronomy 25:17-19 (at the end of Parasha Ki Teitzei), describing the attack on the weakest by Amalek, is recounted. There is a tradition from the Talmud that Haman, the antagonist of the Purim story, was descended from Amalek. The portion that is read includes a commandment to remember the attack by Amalek, and therefore at this public reading both men and women make a special effort to hear the reading.

Shabbat Parah

Shabbat Parah ("Sabbath [of the] red heifer" שבת פרה) takes place on the Shabbat preceding Shabbat HaChodesh, in preparation for Passover.  Numbers 19:1-22 (the beginning of Parasha Chukat) describes the parah adumah ("red heifer") in the Jewish Temple as part of the manner in which the kohanim and the Jews purified themselves so that they would be ready ("pure") to sacrifice the korban Pesach.

Shabbat HaChodesh

Shabbat HaChodesh ("Sabbath [of the] month" שבת החודש) takes place on the Shabbat preceding the first of the Hebrew month of Nisan (or on the 1st of Nisan itself if it falls on Shabbat), during which Passover is celebrated.  A special maftir, Exodus 12:1-20 (from Parashah Bo) is read, in which the laws of Passover are defined.  On the first day of Nisan, God presented the first commandment of how to "sanctify the new moon" (kiddush hachodesh) for the onset of Rosh Chodesh and thus Nisan becomes the first month of the Jewish year (counting by months).

Shabbat HaGadol 

Shabbat HaGadol ("Great Shabbat" שבת הגדול) is the Shabbat immediately before Passover. The first Shabbat HaGadol took place in Egypt on 10 Nisan five days before the Israelite Exodus. On that day, the Israelites were given their first commandment which applied only to that Shabbat, "On the tenth day of this month (Nisan)... each man should take a lamb for the household, a lamb for each home (Exodus 12:3).  There is a special Haftarah reading on this Shabbat of the book of Malachi.  Traditionally a lengthy and expansive sermon is given to the general community in the afternoon.

Various reasons are given for the name of this Shabbat:

 The Midrash Rabbah states: “When they (the Jewish people) set aside their paschal lamb on that Shabbat, the first-born gentiles gathered near the Israelites and asked them why they were doing this. The following was their response: “This is a Pesach offering to God who will kill the firstborn Egyptians.” They (the firstborn) went to their fathers and to Pharaoh to request that they grant permission to send the Jewish people free – but they refused. The first-born then waged a war against them and many of them (the Egyptians) were killed. This is the meaning of the verse: “Who struck Egypt through its first born; for His kindness is eternal”.
 The Tur states: The lamb was the Egyptian deity. Many Jews, after 210 years of immersion within Egyptian civilization, had also adopted this animal as their god. When God commanded that a lamb be set aside and tied to the bed for four days in anticipation of sacrifice, the Jewish people abandoned their idolatrous practice and courageously fulfilled this mitzvah in the eyes of the Egyptian people, thereby demonstrating their complete trust and faith in God. Nothing could have been more abominable to the Egyptians, for their god was to be slaughtered. Nevertheless, miraculously the Egyptians were unable to utter a word or lift a hand. They watched helplessly as their god was being prepared for slaughter. This miracle was a  great miracle (nes gadol) and gives this Shabbat its name.
 The Peri Hadash writes: On this day the Jewish people were commanded to fulfill their first mitzvah – to set aside the lamb as a sacrifice. (Note: The mitzvah of Rosh Chodesh was not one they practically fulfilled at that time on that month.) This significant achievement is therefore called Gadol. Additionally, by fulfilling this first mitzvah they became like a child maturing into adulthood – they celebrated their Bar/Bat Mitzvah. In this light, the name Shabbat HaGadol would translate: The Shabbat the Jews became gadol/mature adults.
 The Hatam Sofer writes: On this day the Jewish people fully ‘returned’ (Teshuvah) to their commitment and faith in God (as explained in reason #1). God is called gadol. Therefore, the Jewish People who embraced and subjugated themselves to God earned the title gadol as well. 
 The Shibolei Haleket writes: The customary lengthy Shabbat HaGadol speech makes the Shabbat feel long, drawn out, and ‘gadol’. (A similar reason is given for Yom Kippur being called Tzoma Rabba / The Big Fast – it feels long!).
 Rabbi David ben Joseph Abudarham writes: In the Haftarah of the Shabbat prior to Pesach we read the possuk [Malachi 3:23]: “Hinei Anochi Shole’ach Lachem Et Eliyahu Hanavi Lifnei Bo Yom H-shem HaGadol V’hanorah,”, or "Behold, I send you Elijah the prophet before the coming of the great and awesome day of the Lord." This reason places Shabbat HaGadol in the same category as Shabbat Hazon, Shabbat Nahamu, and Shabbat Shuva for their name is derived from the Haftarah.
 Every Shabbat preceding a festival or festival season is known as Shabbat Hagadol. (Shibolei Haleket)

Shabbat Chazon – of Vision

Shabbat Chazon ("Sabbath [of] vision" שבת חזון, also Shabbat Hazon ) is named for the "Vision of Isaiah over Judah and Jerusalem" (Book of Isaiah 1:1-27) that is read as the Haftarah on this Shabbat at the end of the three weeks between dire straits, which precede the mournful fast of Tisha B'Av.  It is also called black sabbath due to Isaiah's prophecy of rebuke predicting the destruction of the first temple in the siege of Jerusalem and its status as the saddest shabbat of the year (as opposed to the white sabbath, Shabbat Shuvah, immediately preceding Yom Kippur).

Shabbat Nachamu

Shabbat Nachamu ("Sabbath [of] comfort/ing) takes its name from the haftarah from Isaiah in the Book of Isaiah 40:1-26 that speaks of "comforting" the Jewish people for their suffering. It is the first of seven haftarot of consolation leading up to the holiday of Rosh Hashanah, the Jewish New Year.
It occurs on the Shabbat following Tisha B'Av. Shabbat Nachamu is traditionally celebrated with singing, dancing, eating, and musical performances that extend into the early hours of the following morning. Many customs ordain that the celebration should last until the earliest time for Shacharit(morning prayer services). It is also customary to lead into Shabbat Nachamu on Erev Shabbat/Friday with lively musical performance and dance, as well as to resume musical performances after Shacharit on Sunday until Mincha/evening prayer services.

Shabbat Mevarchim

Any Shabbat that precedes and begins the week during which there will be a day or days of a  new Hebrew month (Rosh Chodesh) is known as Shabbat Mevarchim (mevarchim means "they [the congregation] bless" [the forthcoming new month].")

This prayer is recited after the Torah reading before the Torah scroll is carried back to the Torah ark, where it is stored in the synagogue.

Ashkenazi Jews refer to a Shabbos (Shabbat) like this as having Rosh Chodesh bentschen or bentschen Rosh Chodesh. (In Yiddish, bentschen means "(the act of) blessing". derived from Latin benedictio .) It is a custom that women make an extra effort to attend synagogue to hear and recite this prayer.
	
There are Hasidic communities, such as the Chabad community, who wake early in the morning on Shabbat to recite the entire Tehillim in shul, and who hold a gathering of extra rejoicing (known as a farbrengen), in honor of Shabbat Mevarchim.

If the day following Shabbat is Rosh Chodesh, a special haftarah ("Machar Chodesh" - I Samuel 20:18-42) is generally read; if Shabbat itself falls on Rosh Chodesh, both a special maftir and haftarah (Isaiah 66) are generally read, along with Hallel and a special Mussaf. These haftarot may be overridden by another special Shabbat, such as Shabbat Shekalim or Shabbat HaChodesh. Even so, in some communities the haftarah is concluded with the first and last lines of the haftarah of Machar Chodesh or Rosh Chodesh.

Shabbat Chol HaMoed

Each Shabbat during Chol HaMoed, the "intermediate days" of Passover and Sukkot, is known as Shabbat Chol HaMoed ("[the] Shabbat [of the] intermediate days" שבת חול המועד) which occurs up to twice a year during the week-long festivals. It can occur once during Passover and once during Sukkot ("Tabernacles") or in both.

The regular weekly Torah portion is not read on these Sabbaths and instead there are special Torah readings based on the uniqueness of each holiday and the Three Pilgrim Festivals. There are also special maftirs ("additional Torah readings") and Haftarot (readings from the prophets.) See Haftarot for special Sabbaths, Festivals, and Fast Days.

Shabbat Chol Hamoed Pesach
The Shabbat during Chol HaMoed on Passover is known as Shabbat Chol Hamoed Pesach and in addition to the designated Torah reading, maftir, and haftarah readings for that day, the Song of Songs (Shir HaShirim) is read aloud in synagogue in its entirety with special cantillation prior to the Torah reading during services.

Shabbat Chol Hamoed Sukkot
The Shabbat during Chol HaMoed on Sukkot is known as Shabbat Chol Hamoed Sukkot and in addition to the designated Torah reading, maftir, and haftarah readings for that day, Ecclesiastes (Kohelet) is read aloud in synagogue in its entirety with special cantillation prior to the Torah reading during services.

Shovavim

The word Shovavim is a Hebrew acronym for the Torah portions: 
Shin - Shemot
Vav - Va'eira
Bet - Bo
Bet - Beshalach
Yud - Yitro
Mem - Mishpatim

The word Shovavim also means "mischief-makers".

One of each of the first six parashot of the Book of Exodus are read in the synagogue on Shabbat, typically during the Hebrew months of Tevet and Shevat (around January to February in the civil calendar). Kabbalah teaches that it is auspicious to repent of sins.  Some people have the custom of fasting (ta'anit) and giving extra tzedakah during this time, and of reciting Selichot and other Kabbalistic prayers and tikkunim.  

When it is a leap-year, two more weeks are added:
Terumah
Tetzaveh

See also
Havdalah
Shabbat

References

External links
My Jewish Learning: Special Shabbatot
Judaism 101: Special Shabbatot
Orthodox Union: The Four Shabbatot

Shabbat
Jewish observances